Vaglio is a village and former municipality in the canton of Ticino, Switzerland.

In 2001 the municipality was merged with the neighboring municipalities of Cagiallo, Lopagno, Roveredo, Sala Capriasca, and Tesserete to form a new municipality, Capriasca.

References

Former municipalities of Ticino
Villages in Switzerland

lmo:Vaj